Ronald Lee "Pete" Case (December 27, 1940 – December 18, 2008) was an American football offensive guard in the National Football League (NFL) who played for the Philadelphia Eagles and the New York Giants.  He played college football at the University of Georgia and was drafted in the second round of the 1962 NFL Draft.  Case was also selected in the third round of the 1962 AFL Draft by the Houston Oilers.

1940 births
2008 deaths
American football offensive tackles
Georgia Bulldogs football players
Philadelphia Eagles players
New York Giants players
Players of American football from Dayton, Ohio